Stanley E. Porter (born November 23, 1956) is a Canadian–American academic and New Testament scholar, specializing in the Koine Greek grammar and linguistics of the New Testament.

Life and career

Porter was born in Long Beach, California, on November 23, 1956. He studied at Point Loma College, San Diego (B.A., English), Claremont Graduate School, Claremont, California (M.A., English), Trinity Evangelical Divinity School, Deerfield, Illinois (M.A., New Testament), and earned his Ph.D. at the University of Sheffield, Sheffield, UK, in 1988, in both the biblical studies and linguistics departments. He began his teaching career at Biola University, where he taught New Testament, Greek, and English, then taught at Trinity Western University. From 1994, he was Professor of Theology and Head of the Department of Theology and Religious Studies at the University of Surrey Roehampton (formerly Roehampton Institute London, now Roehampton University). Since 2001, he has served as President, Dean, and Professor of New Testament at McMaster Divinity College in Hamilton, Ontario. He also holds the Roy A. Hope Chair in Christian Worldview at McMaster Divinity College (MDC).

Academic works 
Porter is primarily noted for his work on verbal aspect in the Koine Greek of the New Testament, as he has argued that aspect is the major semantic category in the analysis of the Greek verbal system, recognizing three aspects: perfective, imperfective and stative. He has also argued that the Greek verb does not encode temporality but that temporality is depicted by other deictic indicators. His linguistic framework stems from Systemic Functional Linguistics (SFL), founded by Michael Halliday, as can be seen in his use of systemic grammar and system networks in his framework of Greek and aspect, and his use of SFL discourse analysis and register analysis (including cohesion, prominence, and thematization) for biblical interpretation. In addition to Greek linguistics, he has also published on a wide range of other topics, including Paul, Acts, John, the Gospels, historical Jesus, papyrology and textual criticism, hermeneutics, rhetorical criticism, and matters of canon and pseudepigraphy. Porter has contributed to a variety of topics in New Testament studies. For example, in historical Jesus studies, he has argued for adding to the criteria of authenticity the criterion of Greek language and its context, the criterion of Greek textual variance, and the criterion of discourse features. In Pauline studies, he has argued for the Pauline letter collection view that Paul was directly involved in collecting his letters. In textual criticism, he has advocated using the earliest New Testament manuscript for the study of the Greek New Testament, such as Codex Sinaiticus for the entire New Testament, rather than eclectic editions that are commonly used. He has also resurrected the argument, developing the ideas of William Ramsay, Johannes Weiss, and James Hope Moulton, that Paul had likely met Jesus before his crucifixion as a young Pharisee in Jerusalem. As of 2020, Porter has published around 30 books and monographs, as well as 90 edited volumes and 400 journal articles, chapters, and other scholarly contributions.

In addition to his publishing activities, he has served as editor, co-editor, or editorial board member for a number of book series, journals, and publishers, including Baker Greek Grammar Series (Baker), Linguistic Exegesis of the New Testament (MDC Press/Wipf & Stock), Milestones in New Testament Scholarship Series (Kregel), Johannine Studies Series (Brill), Biblical and Ancient Greek Linguistics (MDC Press/Wipf & Stock), Christian Higher Education, Linguistic Biblical Studies (Brill), McMaster Divinity College Press, Journal for the Study of Paul and His Letters, Journal for the Study of the New Testament, The Bible Translator, Journal for the Study of the Historical Jesus, McMaster Journal of Theology and Ministry, Pauline Studies Series (Brill), Texts and Editions for New Testament Study Series (Brill), Journal of Greco-Roman Christianity and Judaism, Septuagint Commentary Series (Brill), Jian Dao: A Journal of Bible and Theology, and Filología Neotestamentaria. Porter was also the executive editor of Sheffield Academic Press during the 1990s. He founded the MDC Linguistics Circle in 2008, fashioned after the Prague Linguistics Circle (or Prague School), which meets monthly during the academic year and hosts discussions on papers by students, faculty, and guest scholars using linguistic methodology for biblical interpretation.

Awards

Porter was awarded a Festschrift in 2016 during the Society of Biblical Literature Annual Meeting for his 60th birthday: The Language and Literature of the New Testament: Essays in Honor of Stanley E. Porter’s 60th Birthday (ed. Lois K. Fuller Dow, Craig A. Evans, and Andrew W. Pitts; Biblical Interpretation Series 150; Leiden: Brill, 2017).

Selected works

References

External links 

 McMaster Divinity College bio
 Domain Thirty-Three blog 
The Centre for Biblical Linguistics, Translation, and Exegesis 
Biblical and Ancient Greek Linguistics  
Journal of Greco-Roman Christianity and Judaism  
Journal for the Study of Paul and his Letters
Pauline Studies series (Brill) 
Johannine Studies series (Brill) 

Academic journal editors
Academics of the University of Roehampton
Alumni of the University of Sheffield
American biblical scholars
Canadian Baptist theologians
Critics of the Christ myth theory
New Testament scholars
Point Loma Nazarene University alumni
Scholars of Koine Greek
Trinity Evangelical Divinity School alumni
1956 births
Living people